Los Angeles County High School for the Arts (LACHSA) is a visual and performing arts high school located on the campus of California State University, Los Angeles (Cal State LA) in Los Angeles, California, United States.

History
The school was founded by philanthropist Caroline Leonetti Ahmanson in 1985.

Overview
LACHSA is a public and tuition-free school. Most people identify the school by its aesthetic campus along with its ability to offer both college preparatory courses and conservatory style training. Though it shares facilities with Cal State LA, the two schools' activities are usually separate. It is operated by the Los Angeles County Office of Education.

The school specializes in preparing students for careers in the arts. It is one of two arts high schools in Los Angeles that allows students from any district within Los Angeles County to attend, the other being Charter High School of the Arts in Van Nuys. Acceptance into the school is based on an audition process for the approximately 130 spots available for incoming students, about 90% of whom are freshmen.

The school has five departments, Dance, Music (Vocals and Instrumental), Theatre, Visual Arts, and Cinematic Arts (Film). There is also a double major offered for Musical Theatre. The Music Department has the most students, followed by the Theatre Department, Visual Arts, Dance, and Cinematic Arts.

In 2012, Academy Award nominee Scott Hamilton Kennedy made an award-winning documentary about LACHSA called Fame High.

In late March 2013, LACHSA officially moved to a more permanent building on the edge of Cal State LA's campus. It has three stories, the third floor being a black box theater, where most performances from the school take place.

Demographics
In 2018–19 LACHSA had  542 students enrolled in grades nine through twelve, with a student-teacher ratio of 6.7:1.

Academic recognition
 LACHSA received a GreatSchools Rating of 9 out of 10.

U.S. News 2021 Rankings
102 in Los Angeles metropolitan area High Schools
227 in California High Schools
1,498 in National Rankings

U.S. News 2020 Rankings
3 in Los Angeles County Office of Education High Schools
128 in Los Angeles metropolitan area High Schools
279 in California High Schools
2,030 in National Rankings

U.S. News 2019 Rankings
165 in Los Angeles metropolitan area High Schools
356 in California High Schools
2,315 in National Rankings

Notable alumni
 Ai, singer
 Anthony Anderson, television actor
 Jon B., singer and songwriter
 Corbin Bleu, actor
 Angel Blue, opera singer
 Phoebe Bridgers, singer and songwriter
 Daniel Brummel, bassist
 Monica Calhoun, actress
 Sadie Calvano, television actress
 Ako Castuera, sculptor, storyboard artist
 Gerald Clayton, jazz pianist and composer
 Zoey Deutch, actress
 Clea DuVall, actress
 Jenna Elfman, actor
 Maya Erskine, actor and writer
 Michael Fitzpatrick, singer and songwriter
 Dillon Francis, music producer
 Angelica Garcia (singer), singer/songwriter
 Eva Gardner, bassist, singer/ songwriter
 Drew Garrett, actor
 Spencer Grammer, television actress
 Josh Groban, singer
 Haim (band), sister band
 Beth Hart, singer
 The Hound, singer
 Taran Killam, television actor
 Thomas Kotcheff, composer
 Josefina Lopez, playwright

 Rashaan Nall, actor
 Ryan Scott Oliver, musical theatre composer and lyricist
 Elizabeth Olsen, actor
 Gretchen Parlato, jazz singer and composer
 Christina Quarles, painter
 Ernando Recendez, singer/songwriter
 Marla Sokoloff, actress and musician
 Tammy Townsend, actress and singer
 McKenzie Westmore, television actress
 Kehinde Wiley, painter
 Finn Wittrock, television actor

References

External links
 Official LACHSA website

High schools in Los Angeles
Art in Greater Los Angeles
California State University, Los Angeles
Eastside Los Angeles
El Sereno, Los Angeles
Public high schools in California
Drama schools in the United States
 
Educational institutions established in 1985
1985 establishments in California